The British Quality Foundation (BQF) is an independent, not-for-profit corporate membership organisation and was founded by the Department for Trade and Industry and UK business leaders in 1993.

The BQF’s Patron is The Princess Royal and the current president is David Callaghan, senior vice president of alliances and channels, Oracle Corporation Europe, Middle East and Africa.

Membership 
BQF’s members range from leading international companies to small firms and public sector bodies. Membership can be for a whole organisation, a division, a department or even a single unit, and there are different categories of membership depending on the size of organisation (Bronze, Silver, Gold and Gold Plus) and the level of service and benefits required. Premier members get benefits including best practice events and workshops.

Products and services 
BQF provides support to organisations with a range of performance improvement products and services that include awards, certification, conferences, networking opportunities, training and workshops.

BQF also provides a range of training and certifications to corporates

BQF specialises in the EFQM Excellence Model, Europe’s leading performance improvement methodology, and as an EFQM Primary Partner, is the only organisation in England and Wales able to provide EFQM's full range of supporting products and services.

References

External links 
The BQF

1993 establishments in the United Kingdom
Foundations based in the United Kingdom
Organizations established in 1993
Quality